The LG Watch Style is a smartwatch released by LG Corporation on 9 February 2017. The device is one of the first smartwatches to ship with Android Wear version 2.0.

References

External links 

Android (operating system) devices
Products introduced in 2017
Wear OS devices
Wearable computers
Smartwatches
LG Electronics products